Amir Mohammad Fattahpour (born 14 May 1993) is an Iranian slalom canoeist. He competed at the 2010, 2014 and 2018 Asian Games, with the best result of fifth place in the K-1 event in 2018, and won bronze medals at the 2010 and 2017 Asian Championships.

References

Iranian male canoeists
1993 births
Living people
Canoeists at the 2010 Asian Games
Canoeists at the 2014 Asian Games
Canoeists at the 2018 Asian Games
Asian Games competitors for Iran